A Man Apart is a 2003 American vigilante action film directed by F. Gary Gray and co-produced by and starring Vin Diesel as Sean Vetter, an undercover DEA agent who is on a vendetta to take down a mysterious drug lord named Diablo after his wife is murdered. The film also stars Larenz Tate with Timothy Olyphant, Geno Silva, and Steve Eastin. Released by New Line Cinema in the United States on April 4, 2003, it received generally negative reviews from critics and performed poorly at the box office.

Plot

Sean Vetter and Demetrius Hicks, former criminals, are members of the U.S. DEA working on the California/Mexico border. After arresting drug baron, Memo Lucero, the mysterious "Diablo" steps in and organizes the assassination of Vetter, but his wife, Stacy is killed instead.

Looking for revenge, Vetter acts outside the law to punish his wife's murderers. To accomplish that, he asks Memo, now in prison, for help finding Diablo. With Hicks' help, he hunts every member of the cartel from the bottom to the top of the organization's hierarchy and finds that Memo is linked to the recent activities.

Cast
 Vin Diesel as DEA Agent Sean Vetter
 Larenz Tate as DEA Agent Demetrius Hicks
 Timothy Olyphant as Hollywood Jack Slayton
 Geno Silva as Memo "Diablo" Lucero
 Jacqueline Obradors as Stacy Vetter
 Karrine Steffans as Candice Hicks
 Steve Eastin as Supervisory DEA Agent Ty Frost
 Juan Fernández as Mateo Santos
 Jeff Kober as Pomona Joe
 Marco Rodríguez as Hondo
 Mike Moroff as Gustavo Leon
 Emilio Rivera as Garza
 Laura Salem-Harding as Nightclub Worker
 George Sharperson as Big Sexy
 Malieek Straughter as Monroe "Overdose" Johnson
 Alice Amter as Marta
 Ken Davitian as Ramon Cadena

Release

Box office
After a prolonged delay, A Man Apart was finally released April 4, 2003 in 2,459 theaters  and grossed $11,019,224 on its opening weekend, ranking #3 at the box office. As of July 10, 2003, the film has a domestic box office gross of $26,736,098 and an international gross of $17,614,828, giving it a worldwide total of $44,350,926.

Critical reception
The film was panned by critics. On Rotten Tomatoes, it has an approval rating of 11% based on 132 reviews, with an average rating of 4/10. The site's consensus is: "Action and drama elements don't mix well in this clichéd actioner". On Metacritic, the film has an average score of 36 out of 100 based on 32 reviews.

Home video
A Man Apart was released on DVD on September 2, 2003, as a 'barebones' release, containing no special features except deleted scenes and trailers. It was criticized for its poor video transfer. The film was later released on Blu-ray Disc on August 14, 2012.

Lawsuit
The film's original title, "Diablo" was the subject of a lawsuit by the video game company Blizzard Entertainment in 2001 when the developer/publisher filed against New Line Cinema, claiming trademark infringement on the name Diablo (a title used by Blizzard for a franchise of role-playing video games).  A court initially ruled in favor of Blizzard, but the decision was reversed on appeal. Ultimately, New Line changed the film's name.

Soundtrack
 "The Messenjah (Tweaker Remix)" - P.O.D
 "Straight Out of Line" - Godsmack
 "Right Now" - Korn
 "I'm Tired of Good, I'm Trying Bad" - Bootsy Collins
 "Touch" - Seal
 "Descarga Total" - Maraca
 "Double Drums" - Peter Kruder
 "6 Underground" - Sneaker Pimps
  "But I Feel Good" - Groove Armada
  "King for a Day" - Jamiroquai
  "Buena" - Morphine
 "My Own Prison" - Creed
 "Rover Take Over" - Lords of Acid
  "Gone!" - The Cure
  "Broken Home" - Papa Roach
 "Nothing To Lose" - Buddy Klein
 “Blurry” - Puddle Of Mudd

Footnotes

  The film's distribution rights were transferred to Warner Bros. in 2008.

References

External links
 
 
 
 

2003 films
2003 action thriller films
2003 crime thriller films
2000s vigilante films
American films about revenge
American action thriller films
American crime thriller films
American vigilante films
Films about the Drug Enforcement Administration
Films about Mexican drug cartels
Films directed by F. Gary Gray
Films produced by Vin Diesel
Films produced by Vincent Newman
Films scored by Anne Dudley
Films set in California
New Line Cinema films
2000s English-language films
2000s American films
2000s Mexican films